Rage and Passion is a Hong Kong television series adapted from Louis Cha's novels The Legend of the Condor Heroes and The Return of the Condor Heroes. It was released overseas on 31 October 1992.

Plot
The story is an unofficial prequel to Louis Cha's novel The Legend of the Condor Heroes. It tells the story behind the birth of Wong Chung-yeung and his early life.

Cast
 Note: Some of the characters' names are in Cantonese romanisation.

 Ekin Cheng as Wong Chung-yeung
 Fiona Leung as Lam Chiu-ying
 Gallen Lo as Yuen-ngan Fung
 Eddie Kwan as Tin-sang
 Vivian Chow as Ching Yuek-see
 Lam Sheung-mo as Yuen-sang
 Cheung Yick as Fok King-san
 Newton Lai as Seung-sang / Wong Seung
 Mary Hon as Lam Ling-so
 Money Lo as Fok Mo-seung
 Wayne Lai as Chow Pak-tung
 Cheung Ying-choi as Tin-lung
 Henry Lee as Lin-sang
 Cheng Lui as Yuen-ngan Pat
 Pau Fong as Sect leader
 Amy Wu as Chow Yuet-ying
 Ho Pik-kin as Old abbot
 Lee Yiu-king as Chong-chung
 Lee Wong-sang as Koo-chung
 Mak Tsi-wan as Chek-chung
 Tsui Po-lun as Ching-chung
 Lee Ka-ho as Yuen-ngan Put
 Cheng Suet as Yuen-ngan Kwai
 Mak Ho-wai as Royal advisor
 Choi Kwok-hing as Ha-to
 Au Ngok as Farmer
 Chan Yin-hong as Ah-chu
 Wilson Tsui as Ah-chun
 Law Kwan-tso as Ah-fu
 Lily Liu as Aunt Suen

External links

TVB dramas
Hong Kong wuxia television series
Television shows based on The Legend of the Condor Heroes
1992 Hong Kong television series debuts
1992 Hong Kong television series endings
Television series set in the Northern Song
Television series set in the Southern Song
Prequel television series
Cantonese-language television shows